is a private university in Setagaya, Tokyo, Japan.

Combined teams of the Graduate School of Engineering and the Department of Science and Engineering competed against 130 team and came in 11th place in the 27th Formula SAE in 2007. This is the highest order at the participation university from Japan at present.

The origins of Kokushikan University lie in the Kokushikan private academy, founded in Tokyo's Azabu District in 1917, midway through Japan's turbulent Taisho period. Founder Tokujiro Shibata and his young colleagues envisaged that this academy would "cultivate competent individuals endowed with wisdom and courage." Kokushikan, which has produced more than 146,000 graduates active in all spheres of society.

Since its foundation in 1917, Kokushikan University has been working diligently to realize the educational philosophy, which is aimed to cultivate students so that they can contribute to the world peace and development. In the statement of the purport for establishing Kokushikan University, the significance of spiritual civilization is noted, lamenting the social malady of material civilization. Also, the university has been working consistently to instill a spirit of "knowledge and action", which has become a tradition over the years, and at present, the university offers education based on this principle.

Organization

Graduate schools 
Political Science
Economics
Business Administration
Sport System
Engineering
Law
Interdisciplinary Intellectual Property Law  
Human Sciences
Globalising Asia

Undergraduate faculties 
Political Science and Economics
Political Science 
Economics 
Business Administration 
Physical Education
Sport and Physical Education  
Martial Arts  
Sport and Medical Science 
Engineering
Reorganization April in 2007, for Science and Engineering 
Law
Law
Modern Business Law
Letters
Education
History and Geography
Literature
School of Asia 21
Asia 21

Research institute 
Research Institutes and Centers
International Center
Asia-Japan Research Center 
Institute of Budo and Moral Education
Lifelong Learning Center
Wellness Research Center
Institute for Cultural Studies of Ancient Iraq 
Institute for the Study of Politics
Placement Center

Others 
University Library
Guesthouse 
Student dormitory
Kokushikan Foreign Student Alumni Meeting
Cultural Exchange Center with Loval Citizen

Scholarship 
Studies excellent scholarship
Athletic skills excellent scholarship
Study help scholarship
Students from abroad scholarship
Department of Engineering Shiozawa scholarship
Rinichi Kitsutaka Commemoration study fund (only for students of the Department of Letters from Chiba Prefecture)
Muneo Nakamura Study fund (only for students of the School of Law)

Campus 

Setagaya Campus: (Main campus) 4-28-1 Setagaya, Setagaya, Tokyo 154–8515, Japan
Machida Campus:  Hirohakama, Machida, Tokyo, Japan 195-8550
Tama Campus:  Nagayama, Tama, Tokyo, Japan 206-8515
Setagaya-Umegaoka Campus: 1223-1 Umegaoka, Setagaya, Tokyo, Japan

External relations

Setagaya Six Universities Consortium 
In addition to Kokushikan University, the other participants in the Setagaya Six Universities Consortium (世田谷6大学コンソーシアム Setagaya Roku Daigaku Konsōshiamu) are as follows:
Komazawa University
Seijo University
Showa Women's University
Tokyo University of Agriculture
Musashi Institute of Technology

Metropolitan west-area university credit transfer 
Kokushikan University is in a credit transfer agreement with the following area schools:
Azabu University
Sagami Women's University
Kitasato University
Joshibi University of Art and Design
Obirin University
Tamagawa University
Tokyo Jogakkan College
Kanagawa Institute of Technology
Shoin University
Tokyo University of Agriculture 
Showa University of Music
Tokyo Polytechnic University
Sanno University
Den-en Chofu University
Kokugakuin University
Toyo Eiwa University
Kamakura Women's University
Takachiho University

Sister schools

Asia 
 China
Beijing Normal University
Beijing University of Technology
Shanxi University
Soochow University
Heilongjiang University
Shanghai Institute of Foreign Trade
Wuhan University
Jilin University
Dalian University of Foreign Languages
Neusoft Institute of Information

 Indonesia
Gadjah Mada University
Sebelas Maret University

 Kazakhstan
Al-Farabi Kazakh National University

 Kyrgyzstan
Kyrgyz National University

 Mongolia
National University of Mongolia

 Myanmar
University of Yangon

 Philippines
De La Salle University

 South Korea
Hanyang University
Chonnam National University
Dong-Eui University
Andong National University
Korea University

 Taiwan
Chinese Culture University
National Sun Yat-sen University

 Thailand
Chulalongkorn University
Chiang Mai University

 Vietnam
Ho Chi Minh City University of Social Sciences and Humanities

North America 
 Canada
Simon Fraser University (one month language training program only)
College of the Rockies (one month language training program only)

 United States
St. John's University
San Francisco State University
University of California, Davis (one month language training program only)

Europe 
 Bulgaria
National Sports Academy
Veliko Tarnovo University

 Germany
 The University of Munich

 Hungary
Semmelweis University

 Russia
Far Eastern Federal University

Research Institute 
 Iraq
The Iraqi State Board of Antiquities and Heritage

Alumni 
Chubee Kagita, Diet member (Liberal Democratic Party)
Hitoshi Saito, Olympic gold medal (judoka)
Keiji Suzuki, Olympic gold medal (judoka)
Masato Uchishiba, Olympic gold medal (judoka)
Satoshi Ishii, Olympic gold medal (judoka)
Rika Usami, karateka
 Sadaki Nakabayashi once the highest ranking Judoka in the United States
Harumi Hiroyama, long-distance runner
Tetsuji Hashiratani, football player
Michiyoshi Ohara, professional wrestler
Naofumi Yamamoto, professional wrestler
Passion Yara, comedian
Miyata Toshiya, member of Kis-My-Ft2
 Ryota Hasegawa, The liar
Megumi Fujii, mixed martial artist

Affiliated schools 
Kokushikan High School
Kokushikan Junior High School
Welfare Professional School of Kokushikan University

External links 

 (in Japanese,)

Private universities and colleges in Japan
Kokushikan University
Western Metropolitan Area University Association
American football in Japan
Educational institutions established in 1917
1917 establishments in Japan
Setagaya
Machida, Tokyo
Tama, Tokyo